It's Yours may refer to:
 It's Yours (J. Holiday song)
 It's Yours (Tamia song)
 It's Yours, a song by Jon Cutler
 It's Yours, a song by Kyle from the album Light of Mine